Brent Robert Bartholomew (born October 22, 1976) is a former American football punter of the National Football League. He was drafted by the Miami Dolphins in the sixth round of the 1999 NFL Draft. He played college football at Ohio State.

Bartholomew was also a member of the Chicago Bears and Washington Redskins.

References

1976 births
Living people
Players of American football from Birmingham, Alabama
American football punters
Ohio State Buckeyes football players
Miami Dolphins players
Chicago Bears players
Washington Redskins players